ASC Yeggo is a football club from Senegal. They are one of the top-flight football clubs. 3,000 capacity Stade de Ngor is used for their home games.

Football clubs in Senegal
Sports clubs in Dakar